Nebalia is a large genus of small crustaceans containing more than half of the species in the order Leptostraca, and was first described by William Elford Leach in 1814. The genus contains over thirty species:

Nebalia abyssicola Ledoyer, 1997
Nebalia antarctica Dahl, 1990
Nebalia biarticulata Ledoyer, 1997
Nebalia bipes (Fabricius, 1780)
Nebalia borealis Dahl, 1985
Nebalia brucei Olesen, 1999
Nebalia cannoni Dahl, 1990
Nebalia capensis Barnard, 1914
Nebalia clausi Dahl, 1985
Nebalia dahli Kazmi & Tirmizi, 1989
Nebalia daytoni Vetter, 1996
Nebalia falklandensis Dahl, 1990
Nebalia geoffroyi Milne-Edwards, 1928
Nebalia gerkenae Haney & Martin, 2000
Nebalia herbstii Leach, 1814
Nebalia hessleri Martin, Vetter & Cash-Clark, 1996
Nebalia ilheoensis Kensley, 1976
Nebalia kensleyi Haney & Martin, 2005
Nebalia kocatasi Moreira, Kocak & Katagan, 2007
Nebalia lagartensis Escobar-Briones & Villalobos-Hiriart, 1995
Nebalia longicornis Thomson, 1879
Nebalia marerubri Wägele, 1983
Nebalia melanophthalma Ledoyer, 2002
Nebalia mortoni Lee & Bamber, 2011
Nebalia neocaledoniensis Ledoyer, 2002
Nebalia patagonica Dahl, 1990
Nebalia reboredae Moreira & Urgorri, 2009
Nebalia schizophthalma Haney, Hessler & Martin, 2001
Nebalia strausi Risso, 1826
Nebalia troncosoi Moreira, Cacabelos & Dominguez, 2003
Nebalia villalobosi Ortiz, Winfield & Chazaro-Olvera, 2011

References

Leptostraca
Taxa named by William Elford Leach
Crustacean genera
Crustaceans described in 1814